The 2020 Wake Forest Demon Deacons football team represented Wake Forest University during the 2020 NCAA Division I FBS football season. The team was led by seventh-year head coach Dave Clawson, and played their home games at Truist Field at Wake Forest in Winston-Salem, North Carolina, competing in the Atlantic Coast Conference (ACC).

Schedule
Wake Forest had games scheduled against Appalachian State, Old Dominion, Villanova, Duke, Miami, Notre Dame, and Florida State which were all canceled due to the COVID-19 pandemic.

The ACC released their schedule on July 29, with specific dates selected at a later date.

Coaching staff

Players drafted into the NFL

References

Wake Forest
Wake Forest Demon Deacons football seasons
Wake Forest Demon Deacons football